Dr. Wilford B. Poe (born 1937) and received his bachelor's degree from the University of Florida in 1958. He is the current Vice-President for the Space Systems Group.  He focuses on attitude control systems for Space Station Freedom, flight control systems for the Space Shuttle and guidance systems for the Atlas Centaur and Titan 4 launch vehicles.

University of Florida alumni
1937 births
Living people